In the United Kingdom, a chief police officer is the most senior police officer in a police force. The chief police officers are the 53 Chief Constables, the Commissioner of the City of London Police and the Commissioner of the Metropolitan Police. They are members of the National Police Chiefs' Council. 

Through legislation, chief police officers are given powers such as to permit public processions, or grant firearms licenses. Some such activities can be delegated to any constable.

Chief officer rank
Officers holding the ranks of assistant chief constable, deputy chief constable, chief constable, and those holding the following ranks in either the Metropolitan Police Service or City of London Police: commander, deputy assistant commissioner, assistant commissioner, the deputy commissioner and the commissioner are also members of the NPCC. These ranks are usually referred to as the "chief officer" ranks, although only the commissioners and chief constables are actual chiefs of a police forces.

See also
Chief of police, a North American title
Law enforcement in the United Kingdom
List of law enforcement agencies in the United Kingdom, Crown Dependencies and British Overseas Territories

References

 
Police positions in the United Kingdom